Khari Aghlan (also Romanized as Kharī Āghlān; also known as Khar Āghlān) is a village in Mangur-e Gharbi Rural District, in the Central District of Piranshahr County, West Azerbaijan Province, Iran. At the 2006 census, its population was 208, in 27 families.

References 

Populated places in Piranshahr County